The Office of Legislative Affairs is a division within the United States Department of Justice. Its responsibility is for the development and implementation of strategies to advance the department's legislative initiatives and other interests relating to Congress.

List of assistant attorneys general for legislative affairs
 Carlos Uriarte (August 15, 2022 – present)
 Peter Hyun (November 22, 2021 – August 15, 2022; acting)
 Helaine Greenfeld (January 20, 2021 – November 22, 2021; acting)
 Stephen Boyd (September 5, 2017 – January 20, 2021)
 Peter J. Kadzik (June 2014 – January 2017)
 Judith C. Appelbaum (June 13, 2012 – March 2013)
 Ronald H. Weich (April 29, 2009 – April 25, 2012)
 Richard Hertling (2003 – 2007; acting)
 Daniel J. Bryant (2001 – 2003)
 Jon Jennings (1999 – 2000)
 John R. Bolton (1985 – 1989)
 Robert A. McConnell (1981 – 1985)
 Patricia Wald (1977 – 1979)
 Michael Uhlmann (1975 – 1977)
 Mitch McConnell (1975; acting)
 W. Vincent Rakestraw (March 3, 1974 – February 1, 1975)
 Mike McKevitt (1973)

References

External links
 

United States Department of Justice agencies